Nash Peak is a prominent peak 1.4 nautical miles (2.6 km) north of the Mount Bird summit in northwest Ross Island. The feature rises to over 1600 m. Named by the New Zealand Geographic Board (NZGB) (2000) after Sir Walter Nash, who was deeply involved in promoting New Zealand's role in Antarctica and who signed the Antarctic Treaty for New Zealand as Prime Minister.

Mountains of Ross Island